Richard Maxwell Grieve (29 June 1924 – 12 February 1997) was a Scottish professional footballer, who played as an inside forward. He made 1 appearance in the English Football League with Wrexham, and also 1 appearance with at the time Scottish League Division B side Dundee United.

References

1924 births
1997 deaths
Montrose F.C. players
Rochdale A.F.C. players
Wrexham A.F.C. players
Dundee United F.C. players
Association football forwards
Scottish footballers
English Football League players
Footballers from Aberdeen